Astronomy has long history in Indian subcontinent stretching from pre-historic to modern times. Some of the earliest roots of Indian astronomy can be dated to the period of Indus Valley civilisation or earlier. Astronomy later developed as a discipline of Vedanga, or one of the "auxiliary disciplines" associated with the study of the Vedas, dating 1500 BCE or older. The oldest known text is the Vedanga Jyotisha, dated to 1400–1200 BCE (with the extant form possibly from 700 to 600 BCE).

Indian astronomy was influenced by Greek astronomy beginning in the 4th century BCE and through the early centuries of the Common Era, for example by the Yavanajataka and the Romaka Siddhanta, a Sanskrit translation of a Greek text disseminated from the 2nd century.

Indian astronomy flowered in the 5th–6th century, with Aryabhata, whose work, Aryabhatiya, represented the pinnacle of astronomical knowledge at the time. The Aryabhatiya is composed of four sections, covering topics such as units of time, methods for determining the positions of planets, the cause of day and night, and several other cosmological concepts. Later the Indian astronomy significantly influenced Muslim astronomy, Chinese astronomy, European astronomy, and others. Other astronomers of the classical era who further elaborated on Aryabhata's work include Brahmagupta, Varahamihira and Lalla.

An identifiable native Indian astronomical tradition remained active throughout the medieval period and into the 16th or 17th century, especially within the Kerala school of astronomy and mathematics.

History

Some of the earliest forms of astronomy can be dated to the period of Indus Valley civilisation, or earlier. Some cosmological concepts are present in the Vedas, as are notions of the movement of heavenly bodies and the course of the year. The Rig Veda is one of the oldest pieces of Indian literature. Rig Veda 1-64-11 & 48 describes time as a wheel with 12 parts and 360 spokes (days), with a remainder of 5, making reference to the solar calendar. As in other traditions, there is a close association of astronomy and religion during the early history of the science, astronomical observation being necessitated by spatial and temporal requirements of correct performance of religious ritual. Thus, the Shulba Sutras, texts dedicated to altar construction, discusses advanced mathematics and basic astronomy. Vedanga Jyotisha is another of the earliest known Indian texts on astronomy, it includes the details about the Sun, Moon, nakshatras, lunisolar calendar. The Vedanga Jyotisha describes rules for tracking the motions of the Sun and the Moon for the purposes of ritual. According to the Vedanga Jyotisha, in a yuga or "era", there are 5 solar years, 67 lunar sidereal cycles, 1,830 days, 1,835 sidereal days and 62 synodic months.

Greek astronomical ideas began to enter India in the 4th century BCE following the conquests of Alexander the Great. By the early centuries of the Common Era, Indo-Greek influence on the astronomical tradition is visible, with texts such as the Yavanajataka and Romaka Siddhanta.
Later astronomers mention the existence of various siddhantas during this period, among them a text known as the
Surya Siddhanta. These were not fixed texts but rather an oral tradition of knowledge, and their content is not extant. The text today known as Surya Siddhanta dates to the Gupta period and was received by Aryabhata.

The classical era of Indian astronomy begins in the late Gupta era, in the 5th to 6th centuries.
The Pañcasiddhāntikā by Varāhamihira (505 CE) approximates the method for determination of the meridian direction from any three positions of the shadow using a gnomon. By the time of Aryabhata the motion of planets was treated to be elliptical rather than circular. Other topics included definitions of different units of time, eccentric models of planetary motion, epicyclic models of planetary motion, and planetary longitude corrections for various terrestrial locations.

Calendars

The divisions of the year were on the basis of religious rites and seasons (Rtu). The duration from mid March—mid May was taken to be spring (vasanta), mid May—mid July: summer (grishma), mid July—mid September: rains (varsha), mid September—mid November: autumn (sharad), mid November—mid January: winter (hemanta), mid January—mid March: the dews (shishir).

Hindu calendars have several eras:

 The Hindu calendar, counting from the start of the Kali Yuga, has its epoch on 18 February 3102 BCE Julian (23 January 3102 BCE Gregorian).
 The Vikram Samvat calendar, introduced about the 12th century, counts from 56 to 57 BCE.
 The "Saka Era", used in some Hindu calendars and in the Indian national calendar, has its epoch near the vernal equinox of year 78.
 The Saptarishi calendar traditionally has its epoch at 3076 BCE.

J.A.B. van Buitenen (2008) reports on the calendars in India:

Astronomers

Instruments used

Among the devices used for astronomy was gnomon, known as Sanku, in which the shadow of a vertical rod is applied on a horizontal plane in order to ascertain the cardinal directions, the latitude of the point of observation, and the time of observation. This device finds mention in the works of Varāhamihira, Āryabhata, Bhāskara, Brahmagupta, among others. The Cross-staff, known as Yasti-yantra, was used by the time of Bhaskara II (1114–1185 CE). This device could vary from a simple stick to V-shaped staffs designed specifically for determining angles with the help of a calibrated scale. The clepsydra (Ghatī-yantra) was used in India for astronomical purposes until recent times. Ōhashi (2008) notes that: "Several astronomers also described water-driven instruments such as the model of fighting sheep."

The armillary sphere was used for observation in India since early times, and finds mention in the works of Āryabhata (476 CE). The Goladīpikā—a detailed treatise dealing with globes and the armillary sphere was composed between 1380 and 1460 CE by Parameśvara. On the subject of the usage of the armillary sphere in India, Ōhashi (2008) writes: "The Indian armillary sphere (gola-yantra) was based on equatorial coordinates, unlike the Greek armillary sphere, which was based on ecliptical coordinates, although the Indian armillary sphere also had an ecliptical hoop. Probably, the celestial coordinates of the junction stars of the lunar mansions were determined by the armillary sphere since the seventh century or so. There was also a celestial globe rotated by flowing water."

An instrument invented by the mathematician and astronomer Bhaskara II (1114–1185 CE) consisted of a rectangular board with a pin and an index arm. This device—called the Phalaka-yantra—was used to determine time from the sun's altitude. The Kapālayantra was an equatorial sundial instrument used to determine the sun's azimuth. Kartarī-yantra combined two semicircular board instruments to give rise to a 'scissors instrument'. Introduced from the Islamic world and first finding mention in the works of Mahendra Sūri—the court astronomer of Firuz Shah Tughluq (1309–1388 CE)—the astrolabe was further mentioned by Padmanābha (1423 CE) and Rāmacandra (1428 CE) as its use grew in India.

Invented by Padmanābha, a nocturnal polar rotation instrument consisted of a rectangular board with a slit and a set of pointers with concentric graduated circles. Time and other astronomical quantities could be calculated by adjusting the slit to the directions of α and β Ursa Minor. Ōhashi (2008) further explains that: "Its backside was made as a quadrant with a plumb and an index arm. Thirty parallel lines were drawn inside the quadrant, and trigonometrical calculations were done graphically. After determining the sun's altitude with the help of the plumb, time was calculated graphically with the help of the index arm."

Ōhashi (2008) reports on the observatories constructed by Jai Singh II of Amber:

The seamless celestial globe invented in Mughal India, specifically Lahore and Kashmir, is considered to be one of the most impressive astronomical instruments and remarkable feats in metallurgy and engineering. All globes before and after this were seamed, and in the 20th century, it was believed by metallurgists to be technically impossible to create a metal globe without any seams, even with modern technology. It was in the 1980s, however, that Emilie Savage-Smith discovered several celestial globes without any seams in Lahore and Kashmir. The earliest was invented in Kashmir by Ali Kashmiri ibn Luqman in 1589–90 CE during Akbar the Great's reign; another was produced in 1659–60 CE by Muhammad Salih Tahtawi with Arabic and Sanskrit inscriptions; and the last was produced in Lahore by a Hindu metallurgist Lala Balhumal Lahuri in 1842 during Jagatjit Singh Bahadur's reign. 21 such globes were produced, and these remain the only examples of seamless metal globes. These Mughal metallurgists developed the method of lost-wax casting in order to produce these globes.

International discourse

Indian and Greek astronomy
According to David Pingree, there are a number of Indian astronomical texts that are dated to the sixth century CE or later with a high degree of certainty. There is substantial similarity between these and pre-Ptolemaic Greek astronomy. Pingree believes that these similarities suggest a Greek origin for certain aspects of Indian astronomy. One of the direct proofs for this approach is the fact quoted that many Sanskrit words related to astronomy, astrology and calendar are either direct phonetical borrowings from the Greek language, or translations, assuming complex ideas, like the names of the days of the week which presuppose a relation between those days, planets (including Sun and Moon) and gods.

With the rise of Greek culture in the east, Hellenistic astronomy filtered eastwards to India, where it profoundly influenced the local astronomical tradition. For example, Hellenistic astronomy is known to have been practised near India in the Greco-Bactrian city of Ai-Khanoum from the 3rd century BCE. Various sun-dials, including an equatorial sundial adjusted to the latitude of Ujjain have been found in archaeological excavations there. 
Numerous interactions with the Mauryan Empire, and the later expansion of the Indo-Greeks into India suggest that transmission of Greek astronomical ideas to India occurred during this period. 
The Greek concept of a spherical earth surrounded by the spheres of planets, further influenced the astronomers like Varahamihira and Brahmagupta.

Several Greco-Roman astrological treatises are also known to have been exported to India during the first few centuries of our era. The Yavanajataka is a Sanskrit text of the 3rd century CE on Greek horoscopy and mathematical astronomy. Rudradaman's capital at Ujjain "became the Greenwich of Indian astronomers and the Arin of the Arabic and Latin astronomical treatises; for it was he and his successors who encouraged the introduction of Greek horoscopy and astronomy into India."

Later in the 6th century, the Romaka Siddhanta ("Doctrine of the Romans"), and the Paulisa Siddhanta ("Doctrine of Paul") were considered as two of the five main astrological treatises, which were compiled by Varāhamihira in his Pañca-siddhāntikā ("Five Treatises"), a compendium of Greek, Egyptian, Roman and Indian astronomy. Varāhamihira goes on to state that "The Greeks, indeed, are foreigners, but with them this science (astronomy) is in a flourishing state." Another Indian text, the Gargi-Samhita, also similarly compliments the Yavanas (Greeks) noting they, though barbarians, must be respected as seers for their introduction of astronomy in India.

Indian and Chinese astronomy
Indian astronomy reached China with the expansion of Buddhism during the Later Han (25–220 CE). Further translation of Indian works on astronomy was completed in China by the Three Kingdoms era (220–265 CE). However, the most detailed incorporation of Indian astronomy occurred only during the Tang Dynasty (618–907 CE) when a number of Chinese scholars—such as Yi Xing— were versed both in Indian and Chinese astronomy. A system of Indian astronomy was recorded in China as Jiuzhi-li (718 CE), the author of which was an Indian by the name of Qutan Xida—a translation of Devanagari Gotama Siddha—the director of the Tang dynasty's national astronomical observatory.

Fragments of texts during this period indicate that Arabs adopted the sine function (inherited from Indian mathematics) instead of the chords of arc used in Hellenistic mathematics. Another Indian influence was an approximate formula used for timekeeping by Muslim astronomers. Through Islamic astronomy, Indian astronomy had an influence on European astronomy via Arabic translations. During the Latin translations of the 12th century, Muhammad al-Fazari's Great Sindhind (based on the Surya Siddhanta and the works of Brahmagupta), was translated into Latin in 1126 and was influential at the time.

Indian and Islamic astronomy
Many Indian works on astronomy and astrology were translated into Middle Persian in Gundeshapur the Sasanian Empire and later translated from Middle Persian into Arabic

In the 17th century, the Mughal Empire saw a synthesis between Islamic and Hindu astronomy, where Islamic observational instruments were combined with Hindu computational techniques. While there appears to have been little concern for planetary theory, Muslim and Hindu astronomers in India continued to make advances in observational astronomy and produced nearly a hundred Zij treatises. Humayun built a personal observatory near Delhi, while Jahangir and Shah Jahan were also intending to build observatories but were unable to do so. After the decline of the Mughal Empire, it was a Hindu king, Jai Singh II of Amber, who attempted to revive both the Islamic and Hindu traditions of astronomy which were stagnating in his time. In the early 18th century, he built several large observatories called Yantra Mandirs in order to rival Ulugh Beg's Samarkand observatory and in order to improve on the earlier Hindu computations in the Siddhantas and Islamic observations in Zij-i-Sultani. The instruments he used were influenced by Islamic astronomy, while the computational techniques were derived from Hindu astronomy.

Indian astronomy and Europe
Some scholars have suggested that knowledge of the results of the Kerala school of astronomy and mathematics may have been transmitted to Europe through the trade route from Kerala by traders and Jesuit missionaries. Kerala was in continuous contact with China, Arabia and Europe.  The existence of circumstantial evidence such as communication routes and a suitable chronology certainly make such a transmission a possibility. However, there is no direct evidence by way of relevant manuscripts that such a transmission took place.

In the early 18th century, Jai Singh II of Amber invited European Jesuit astronomers to one of his Yantra Mandir observatories, who had bought back the astronomical tables compiled by Philippe de La Hire in 1702. After examining La Hire's work, Jai Singh concluded that the observational techniques and instruments used in European astronomy were inferior to those used in India at the time – it is uncertain whether he was aware of the Copernican Revolution via the Jesuits. He did, however, employ the use of telescopes. 
In his Zij-i Muhammad Shahi, he states: "telescopes were constructed in my kingdom and using them a number of observations were carried out".

Following the arrival of the British East India Company in the 18th century, the Hindu and Islamic traditions were slowly displaced by European astronomy, though there were attempts at harmonising these traditions. The Indian scholar Mir Muhammad Hussain had travelled to England in 1774 to study Western science and, on his return to India in 1777, he wrote a Persian treatise on astronomy. He wrote about the heliocentric model, and argued that there exists an infinite number of universes (awalim), each with their own planets and stars, and that this demonstrates the omnipotence of God, who is not confined to a single universe. Hussain's idea of a universe resembles the modern concept of a galaxy, thus his view corresponds to the modern view that the universe consists of billions of galaxies, each one consisting of billions of stars. 
The last known Zij treatise was the Zij-i Bahadurkhani, written in 1838 by the Indian astronomer Ghulam Hussain Jaunpuri (1760–1862) and printed in 1855, dedicated to Bahadur Khan. The treatise incorporated the heliocentric system into the Zij tradition.

Jantar Mantar

Jantar (means yantra, machine); mantar (means calculate). Jai Singh II in the 18th century took great interest in science and astronomy. He made various Jantar Mantars in Jaipur, Delhi, Ujjain, Varanasi and Mathura. The Jaipur instance has 19 different astronomical calculators. These comprise live and forward-calculating astronomical clocks (calculators) for days, eclipses, visibility of key constellations which are not year-round northern polar ones thus principally but not exclusively those of the zodiac. Astronomers abroad were invited and admired complexity of certain devices.

As brass time-calculators are imperfect, and to help in their precise re-setting so as to match true locally experienced time, there remains equally his Samrat Yantra, the largest sundial in the world. It divides each daylit hour as to solar 15-minute, 1-minute and 6-second subunits.

Others notable are the:
Nadivalaya yantra
Rama Yantra
Daksinottara Bhitti
Unnatamsha Yantra
Jai Prakash yantra

Kerala school of astronomy and mathematics

Models of the Kerala school (active 1380 to 1632) involved higher order polynomials and other cutting-edge algebra; many neatly were put to use, principally for predicting motions and alignments within the solar system.

Future astronomy satellite programmes

ISRO develops and delivers application-specific satellites and associated tools to India and data-importers. These include advanced sensors and emitters. As such major applications include: broadcasts, encrypted communications for non-wired outposts such as vessels on the sea, checkpoints and disaster relief points, forecasts, Geographic Information Systems verifying and guiding users by combining access to relevant cartographic and navigation data, telemedicine (medical data access), access to educational data in isolated places.  ISRO launched Mangalyaan in 2014, a mission that cost 10 times less than earlier US NASA equivalents.

See also

Astronomical basis of the Hindu calendar
Astronomy in the medieval Islamic world
Buddhist cosmology
Chinese astronomy
Hindu calendar
Hindu chronology
Hindu cosmology
History of astronomy
Jain cosmology
List of numbers in Hindu scriptures

Further reading
Project of History of Indian Science, Philosophy and culture, Monograph series, Volume 3. Mathematics, Astronomy and Biology in Indian Tradition edited by D. P. Chattopadhyaya and Ravinder Kumar

 
 Kak, Subhash. Birth and early development of Indian astronomy. Kluwer, 2000.
 Kak, S. (2000). The astronomical code of the R̥gveda. New Delhi: Munshiram Manoharlal Publishers.
 Kak, Subhash C. "The astronomy of the age of geometric altars." Quarterly Journal of the Royal Astronomical Society 36 (1995): 385.
 Kak, Subhash C. "Knowledge of planets in the third millennium BC." Quarterly Journal of the Royal Astronomical Society 37 (1996): 709.
 Kak, S. C. (1 January 1993). Astronomy of the vedic altars. Vistas in Astronomy: Part 1, 36, 117–140.
 Kak, Subhash C. "Archaeoastronomy and literature." Current Science 73.7 (1997): 624–627.

Notes

References

 Abraham, G. (2008), "Gnomon in India", Encyclopaedia of the History of Science, Technology, and Medicine in Non-Western Cultures (2nd edition) edited by Helaine Selin, pp. 1035–1037, Springer, .
 
 Baber, Zaheer (1996), The Science of Empire: Scientific Knowledge, Civilization, and Colonial Rule in India, State University of New York Press, .
 Dallal, Ahmad (1999), "Science, Medicine and Technology", The Oxford History of Islam edited by John Esposito, Oxford University Press.
 Hayashi, Takao (2008), Aryabhata I, Encyclopædia Britannica.
 Hayashi, Takao (2008), Bhaskara I, Encyclopædia Britannica.
 Hayashi, Takao (2008), Brahmagupta, Encyclopædia Britannica.
 Hayashi, Takao (2008), Shripati, Encyclopædia Britannica.
 J.A.B. van Buitenen (2008), calendar, Encyclopædia Britannica.
 Joseph, George G. (2000), The Crest of the Peacock: Non-European Roots of Mathematics, Penguin Books, .
 
 Klostermaier, Klaus K. (2003), "Hinduism, History of Science and Religion", Encyclopedia of Science and Religion edited by J. Wentzel Vrede van Huyssteen, pp. 405–410, Macmillan Reference USA, .
 
 
 Sarma, K.V. (2008), "Acyuta Pisarati", Encyclopaedia of the History of Science, Technology, and Medicine in Non-Western Cultures (2nd edition) edited by Helaine Selin, p. 19, Springer, .
 Sarma, K.V. (2008), "Armillary Spheres in India", Encyclopaedia of the History of Science, Technology, and Medicine in Non-Western Cultures (2nd edition) edited by Helaine Selin, p. 243, Springer, .
 Sarma, K.V. (2008), "Astronomy in India", Encyclopaedia of the History of Science, Technology, and Medicine in Non-Western Cultures (2nd edition) edited by Helaine Selin, pp. 317–321, Springer, .
 Sarma, K.V. (2008), "Lalla", Encyclopaedia of the History of Science, Technology, and Medicine in Non-Western Cultures (2nd edition) edited by Helaine Selin, p. 1215, Springer, .
 
 Sharma, V.N. (1995), Sawai Jai Singh and His Astronomy, Motilal Banarsidass, .
 Sharma, V.N. (2008), "Observatories in India", Encyclopaedia of the History of Science, Technology, and Medicine in Non-Western Cultures (2nd edition) edited by Helaine Selin, pp. 1785–1788, Springer, .
 Savage-Smith, Emilie (1985), Islamicate Celestial Globes: Their History, Construction, and Use, Smithsonian Institution Press.
 Subbaarayappa, B.V. (1989), "Indian astronomy: an historical perspective", Cosmic Perspectives edited by Biswas etc., pp. 25–41. Cambridge University Press. .
 Tripathi, V.N. (2008), "Astrology in India", Encyclopaedia of the History of Science, Technology, and Medicine in Non-Western Cultures (2nd edition) edited by Helaine Selin, pp. 264–267, Springer, .

Astronomy in India
History of astronomy